David Svensson (born 4 August 1993) is a Swedish footballer who plays for Eskilsminne IF as a midfielder.

References

External links
 (archive)

1993 births
Living people
Association football midfielders
Helsingborgs IF players
Swedish footballers
Allsvenskan players